"Secret, Voice of My Heart" (stylized as "Secret, voice of my heart") is a song recorded by Japanese singer songwriter Mai Kuraki. It was released as the first promotional single from her upcoming fourteenth studio album, through Northern Music for digital download on 4 October 2022. The song served as the ending theme song to the Japanese comedy anime television series Detective Conan: The Culprit Hanzawa (2022).

Music video
The official lyric video of "Secret, Voice of My Heart" was released on YouTube on February 14, 2023, in celebration of the international release of Detective Conan: The Culprit Hanzawa on Netflix.

Track listing

Charts

Weekly charts

Release history

References

2022 singles
2022 songs
Mai Kuraki songs
Songs written by Mai Kuraki
Song recordings produced by Daiko Nagato